Systomus endecanalis is a species of cyprinid fish endemic to the Kapuas River basin in western Borneo. Although placed in the genus Systomus by FishBase, it has been moved to Desmopuntius by Catalog of Fishes, following a taxonomic review by Maurice Kottelat in 2013.

References 

Systomus
Freshwater fish of Indonesia
Fish described in 1989